Dean Benjamin McLaughlin, Jr. (born 1931) is an American science fiction writer. He was the son of astronomers Dean B. McLaughlin and Laura Elizabeth Hill Mclaughlin.

His best-known work is "Hawk Among the Sparrows" (1968), which was nominated for both the Hugo Award and Nebula Award for Best Novella. 
It concerns a late-20th century fighter plane which travels through time, and tries to contend with World War I aircraft.

Other works include Dawn (1980), a novel inspired by Isaac Asimov's "Nightfall".

He has a novella, "Tenbrook of Mars," in the July/August 2008 issue of Analog.

References 
 

1931 births
Living people
20th-century American novelists
American male novelists
American science fiction writers
American male short story writers
20th-century American short story writers
20th-century American male writers